Wells Township is one of the fourteen townships of Jefferson County, Ohio, United States.  The 2010 census found 2,835 people in the township, 2,813 of whom lived in the unincorporated portions of the township.

Geography
Located in the southeastern part of the county along the Ohio River, it borders the following townships:
Cross Creek Township - north
Steubenville Township - northeast
Warren Township - south
Smithfield Township - west
Wayne Township - northwest

Brooke County, West Virginia lies across the Ohio River to the east.

Part of the village of New Alexandria is located in northern Wells Township.  As well, two unincorporated communities lie in Wells Township: Brilliant in the east, and Weems in the northwest.

Name and history
Wells Township was founded in 1823. It was named for Bezaleel Wells, a founder of Steubenville.

It is the only Wells Township statewide.

Government
The township is governed by a three-member board of trustees, who are elected in November of odd-numbered years to a four-year term beginning on the following January 1. Two are elected in the year after the presidential election and one is elected in the year before it. There is also an elected township fiscal officer, who serves a four-year term beginning on April 1 of the year after the election, which is held in November of the year before the presidential election. Vacancies in the fiscal officership or on the board of trustees are filled by the remaining trustees.

References

External links
Township website
County website

Townships in Jefferson County, Ohio
Townships in Ohio